Sorkol is a village in Kyzylkoga District, Atyrau Region, Kazakhstan. It is part of the Mukyr Rural District (KATO code - 234847600). Population:

Geography

References

Populated places in Atyrau Region